Caroline Pauwels (23 June 1964 – 5 August 2022) was a Belgian communication studies scholar and rector of the Vrije Universiteit Brussel, serving from September 2016 to February 2022.

Career

Caroline Pauwels studied philosophy and communication studies, and worked in the cabinet of European Commissioner Karel Van Miert. She left the European Commission for a career in research, and earned her PhD in 1995. Her dissertation focused on the audiovisual policy of the European Union. She was director of the SMIT research centre from 2000 to 2016. She held a Jean Monnet Chair from 2012 to 2016.

In April 2016 she was elected rector of the Vrije Universiteit Brussel for the term 2016–2020.

Death 
She died on 5 August 2022 at the age of 58.

References

Belgian scholars
Rectors of universities in Belgium
1964 births
2022 deaths
Academic staff of Vrije Universiteit Brussel
People from Sint-Niklaas